Paganico is a village in the province of Grosseto, in southern Tuscany, central Italy. It is a frazione of the comune of Civitella Paganico. It lies in the valley of the Ombrone river, at 66 meters above the sea level. In 2011 it had a population of 961 inhabitants.

History 
The town is of medieval origins, as it was founded in the 13th century by the Republic of Siena in a strategical location overlooking the valley towards the Sienese core lands.

Main sights 
Sights include the Church of St Michael Archangel, built in the 13th-14th centuries. It houses a series of 14th-century frescoes (1368), attributed to the Sienese painter Biagio di Goro Ghezzi and his workshop and depicting the Stories of St. Michael, a 15th-century crucifix, and other Renaissance paintings. The town has also a line of medieval walls with several towers and gates.

See also 
 Casale di Pari
 Civitella Marittima
 Dogana, Civitella Paganico
 Monte Antico
 Pari, Civitella Paganico

External links 
  Paganico, Civitella Paganico official website.

Frazioni of Civitella Paganico
Former municipalities of Tuscany